Kungakbash (Köngäkbaş) is a rural locality (a village) in Kungakovsky Selsoviet, Askinsky District, Bashkortostan, Russia. The population was 1 as of 2010. There is 1 street.

Geography 
Kungakbash is located 61 km northeast of Askino (the district's administrative centre) by road. Kungak is the nearest rural locality.

References 

Rural localities in Askinsky District